Malcolm Andrew is an author, teacher and scholar who was previously Professor of English Language and Literature at Queen's University Belfast.  He started teaching at Queen's in 1985, before which he had worked at the University of East Anglia. He retired in 2007. He also served as Head of School (1986–92), Dean of Humanities (1992–98), and Pro-Vice-Chancellor (1998–2002).

He was convener of the English language board of the British national Arts and Humanities Research Board for several years.

Works 
 
 
  (Dr. Andrew has indicated that he considers The Variorum Chaucer to be his magnum opus.)

References 

British medievalists
Academics of Queen's University Belfast
British writers
Living people
1945 births
People from Paddock Wood